Apamea is a genus of moths in the family Noctuidae first described by Ferdinand Ochsenheimer in 1816.

Some Apamea species are pest insects. The larval Apamea niveivenosa is a cutworm known as a pest of grain crops in North America. The larva of A. apamiformis is the rice worm, the most serious insect pest of cultivated wild rice in the Upper Midwest of the United States.

Selected species
 Apamea acera (Smith, 1900)
 Apamea albina (Grote, 1874)
 Apamea alia (Guenée, 1852)
 Apamea alpigena (Boisduval, [1837])
 Apamea alticola (Smith, 1891)
 Apamea altijuga (Kozhantshikov, 1925)
 Apamea amputatrix (Fitch, 1857) – yellow-headed cutworm  
 Apamea anceps (Denis & Schiffermüller, 1775) – large nutmeg
 Apamea antennata (Smith, 1891)
 Apamea apamiformis (Guenée, 1852) – rice worm, wild rice worm
 Apamea aquila Donzel, 1837
 Apamea arabs (Oberthür, 1881)
 Apamea assimilis (Doubleday, 1847)
 Apamea atriclava (Barnes & McDunnough, 1913)
 Apamea atrosuffusa (Barnes & McDunnough, 1913) (syn. A. grotei (Barnes & McDunnough, 1914))
 Apamea auranticolor (Grote, 1873)
 Apamea baischi Hacker, 1989
 Apamea barbara (Berio, 1940)
 Apamea basimacula Boisduval, 1833
 Apamea bernardino Mikkola & Mustelin 2000
 Apamea boopis (Hampson, 1908)
 Apamea brunnea (Leech, 1900)
 Apamea brunnescens Kononenko, 1985
 Apamea burgessi (Morrison, 1874)
 Apamea caesia Hreblay & Ronkay, 1998
 Apamea cariosa (Guenée, 1852) – nondescript dagger moth
 Apamea centralis (Smith, 1891)
 Apamea chalybeata (Walker, 1865)
 Apamea chhiringi Hreblay, 1998
 Apamea chinensis (Leech, 1900)
 Apamea cinefacta (Grote, 1881)
 Apamea cogitata (Smith, 1891) – thoughtful apamea
 Apamea commixta (Butler, 1881)
 Apamea commoda (Walker, 1857) – southern Quaker
 Apamea commoda commoda (Walker, 1857)
 Apamea commoda parcata (Smith, 1903)
 Apamea commoda striolata Mikkola, 2009
 Apamea concinna (Leech, 1900)
 Apamea contradicta (Smith, 1895) – northern banded Quaker
 Apamea crenata Hufnagel, 1766 – clouded-bordered brindle 
 Apamea cristata (Grote, 1878)
 Apamea cuculliformis (Grote, 1875)
 Apamea cyanea (Hampson, 1908)
 Apamea desegaulxi Viette, 1928
 Apamea devastator Brace, 1819 – glassy cutworm
 Apamea digitula Mikkola and Mustelin, 2006
 Apamea dubitans (Walker, 1856) – doubtful apamea
 Apamea epomidion (Haworth, 1809) – clouded brindle
 Apamea erythrographa Hreblay, Peregovits & Ronkay, 1999
 Apamea euxinia Hacker, 1985
 Apamea exstincta (Staudinger, 1892)
 Apamea fasciata (Leech, 1900)
 Apamea fergusoni Mikkola & Lafontaine, 2009
 Apamea ferrago (Eversmann, 1837)
 Apamea fervida (Hampson, 1908)
 Apamea furva (Denis & Schiffermüller, 1775) – the confused
 Apamea gabrieli Mikkola & Mustelin 2000
 Apamea ganeshi Hreblay, 1998
 Apamea gangtoki Hreblay & Ronkay, 1998
 Apamea geminimacula (Dyar, 1904)
 Apamea genialis (Grote, 1874)
 Apamea glenura (Swinhoe, 1895)
 Apamea glenurina Hreblay & Ronkay, 1999
 Apamea goateri Hacker, 2001
 Apamea goperma Hreblay & Ronkay, 1999
 Apamea gratissima Hreblay & Ronkay, 1999
 Apamea griveaudi Viette, 1967
 Apamea groenlandica (Duponchel, [1838])
 Apamea hampsoni Sugi, 1963
 Apamea heinickei Hreblay, 1998
 Apamea helva (Grote, 1875) – yellow three-spot
 Apamea illyria Freyer, 1846
 Apamea impedita (Christoph, 1887)
 Apamea impulsa (Guenée, 1852)
 Apamea indocilis (Walker, 1856) – ignorant apamea
 Apamea inebriata Ferguson, 1977 – drunk apamea
 Apamea inficita (Walker, 1857) – lined Quaker
 Apamea inordinata (Morrison, 1875)
 Apamea kaszabi Varga, 1982
 Apamea kumari Hreblay & Ronkay, 1999
 Apamea lateritia (Hufnagel, 1766) – scarce brindle
 Apamea leucodon (Eversmann, 1837)
 Apamea lieni Hreblay, 1998
 Apamea lignea (Butler, 1889)
 Apamea lignicolora (Guenée, 1852) – wood-coloured Quaker
 Apamea lintneri Grote, 1873
 Apamea lithoxylaea Denis & Schiffermüller, 1775 – light arches
 Apamea longula (Grote, 1879)
 Apamea lutosa (Andrews, 1877) – opalescent apamea
 Apamea lysis (Fawcett, 1917)
 Apamea macronephra Berio, 1959
 Apamea magnirena (Boursin, 1943)
 Apamea maraschi (Draudt, 1934)
 Apamea maroccana (Zerny, 1934)
 Apamea maxima (Dyar, 1904)
 Apamea michielii Varga, 1976
 Apamea mikkolai Hreblay & Ronkay, 1998
 Apamea minnecii (Berio, 1939)
 Apamea minoica (Fibiger, Schmidt & Zilli, 2005)
 Apamea monoglypha Hufnagel, 1766 – dark arches
 Apamea nekrasovi Mikkola, Gyulai & Varga, 1997
 Apamea nigrior (Smith, 1891) – black-dashed apamea, dark apamea 
 Apamea nigrostria Hreblay, Peregovits & Ronkay, 1999
 Apamea niveivenosa (Grote, 1879) – snowy-veined apamea
 Apamea nubila Moore, 1881
 Apamea obliviosa (Walker, 1858)
 Apamea oblonga (Haworth, 1809) – crescent striped
 Apamea occidens (Grote, 1878) – western apamea
 Apamea ontakensis Sugi, 1982
 Apamea ophiogramma Esper, 1793 – double lobed
 Apamea pallifera (Grote, 1877)
 Apamea permixta Kononenko, 2006
 Apamea perpensa (Grote, 1881)
 Apamea perstriata (Hampson, 1908)
 Apamea platinea (Treitschke, 1825)
 Apamea plutonia (Grote, 1883) – dusky Quaker, dusky apamea 
 Apamea polyglypha (Staudinger, 1892)
 Apamea pseudoaltijuga Grosser, 1985
 Apamea purpurina (Hampson, 1908)
 Apamea quinteri Mikkola & Lafontaine, 2009
 Apamea rectificata Hreblay & Plante, 1995
 Apamea relicina (Morrison, 1875)
 Apamea relicina relicina (Morrison, 1875)
 Apamea relicina migrata (Smith, [1904])
 Apamea remissa Hübner, 1809 – dusky brocade
 Apamea reseri Hreblay & Ronkay, 1998
 Apamea robertsoni  Mikkola and Mustelin, 2006
 Apamea roedereri Viette, 1976
 Apamea rubrirena (Treitschke, 1825)
 Apamea rufa (Draudt, 1950)
 Apamea rufomedialis (Marumo, 1920)
 Apamea rufus (Chang, 1991)
 Apamea sanyibaglya Hreblay & Ronkay, 1998
 Apamea schawerdae (Draeseke, 1928)
 Apamea scolopacina (Esper, 1788) – slender brindle
 Apamea scoparia Mikkola, Mustelin & Lafontaine, 2000
 Apamea shibuyoides Poole, 1989
 Apamea sicula (Turati, 1909)
 Apamea sinuata (Moore, 1882)
 Apamea siskiyou Mikkola & Lafontaine, 2009
 Apamea smythi Franclemont, 1952
 Apamea sodalis (Butler, 1878)
 Apamea sora (Smith, 1903)
 Apamea sordens Hufnagel, 1766 – rustic shoulder-knot
 Apamea spaldingi (Smith, 1909) – Spalding's Quaker
 Apamea stagmatipennis (Dyar, 1920)
 Apamea striata Haruta & Sugi, 1958
 Apamea sublustris (Esper, [1788]) – reddish light arches
 Apamea submarginata (Leech, 1900)
 Apamea submediana (Draudt, 1950)
 Apamea superba (Turati, 1926)
 Apamea syriaca (Osthelder, 1932)
 Apamea tahoeensis Mikkola & Lafontaine, 2009
 Apamea taiwana (Wileman, 1914)
 Apamea terranea (Butler, 1889)
 Apamea unanimis (Hübner, [1813]) – small clouded brindle
 Apamea unita (Smith, 1904)
 Apamea verbascoides (Guenée, 1852) – boreal apamea, mullein apamea 
 Apamea veterina (Lederer, 1853)
 Apamea vicaria (Püngeler, 1902)
 Apamea vulgaris (Grote & Robinson, 1866) – common apamea
 Apamea vultuosa (Grote, 1875) – airy apamea
 Apamea walshi Lafontaine, 2009
 Apamea wasedana Sugi, 1982
 Apamea wikeri Quinter & Lafontaine, 2009
 Apamea xylodes Mikkola & Lafontaine, 2009
 Apamea zeta (Treitschke, 1825)

Former species
 Apamea formosensis is now Leucapamea formosensis (Hampson, 1910)
 Apamea mixta is now Melanapamea mixta (Grote, 1881)

References

Further reading
 Butler (1881). Transactions of Entomological Society of London 1881: 174.

 
Apameini
Noctuoidea genera
Taxa named by Ferdinand Ochsenheimer